Kishori Ram (11 January 1921 – 4 February 2003) was an Indian politician. He was a Member of Parliament, representing Bihar in the Rajya Sabha the upper house of India's Parliament as a member of the Indian National Congress. Ram died on 4 February 2003, at the age of 82.

References

1921 births
2003 deaths
Rajya Sabha members from Bihar
Indian National Congress politicians
Indian National Congress politicians from Bihar